Sir John McCall   (10 August 1860 – 27 June 1919) was an Australian politician.

History
Born in Devonport, Tasmania the son of John Hair McCall, MLC, he studied for his Doctorate of Medicine at the University of Glasgow, returning to Tasmania in 1881. In 1888, he was elected to the Tasmanian House of Assembly as the Protectionist member for West Devon. He served until 1893, and then again from 1901 to 1909. He then took up the post of Tasmania's agent-general in London, where  he served with distinction and died ten years later.

Family
Sir John was married twice; to Mary Chickie (died 28 February 1896), whom he married in Glasgow, and with whom he had a son and a daughter:
The son, also named Dr. John McCall, married Marjorie MacDonald of Fremantle in 1918. Their 3-year old son John died choking on a peanut; Marjorie died of pneumonia a week later.
The daughter, Mary "Mollie" McCall, married Commander Hewitt in 1923;
On 20 November 1900, he married Claire Pearson Reynolds (c. 1882 – 3 June 1945), with whom he had two sons: G. Donald McCall of Mont Albert, Victoria and the Rt Rev. Theodore Bruce McCall home secretary of the (Anglican) Australian Board of Missions and Bishop of Rockhampton and Wangaratta..

References

1860 births
1919 deaths
Members of the Tasmanian House of Assembly
Protectionist Party politicians
Australian Knights Commander of the Order of St Michael and St George
Australian politicians awarded knighthoods
Recipients of the Order of the Crown (Belgium)
Alumni of the University of Glasgow
19th-century Australian medical doctors
Deaths from pneumonia in England